The 2022 United Arab Emirates Women's Quadrangular Series was a women's Twenty20 International (WT20I) cricket tournament that was played in Dubai from 10 to 13 September 2022. The participants were the women's national sides of United Arab Emirates, Thailand, United States and Zimbabwe. The tournament provided all four teams with preparation for the 2022 ICC Women's T20 World Cup Qualifier.

Zimbabwe won all three of their matches to finish top of the table.

Squads

Points Table

Fixtures

References

External links
 Series home at ESPNcricinfo

2022 in women's cricket
Associate international cricket competitions in 2022–23
United Arab Emirates Women's Quadrangular Series